Ataxia luteifrons is a species of beetle in the family Cerambycidae. It was described by Bruch in 1926. It is known from Argentina and Paraguay. It feeds on Schinopsis balansae and Schinopsis quebracho-colorado.

References

Ataxia (beetle)
Beetles described in 1926